The sixth season of the Fairy Tail anime series was directed by Shinji Ishihira and produced by A-1 Pictures and Satelight. Like the rest of the series, it follows the adventures of Natsu Dragneel and Lucy Heartfilia of the fictional guild Fairy Tail. It contains a single story arc, titled , which adapts material from the beginning of the 31st through the ending of the 35th volumes of Hiro Mashima's Fairy Tail manga over 24 episodes. Focusing on Natsu and the others who were frozen in time for seven years on Tenrou Island, the members return to Magnolia and discover that Saber Tooth is the strongest guild in the Fiore Kingdom. Having become the weakest guild during the absence of its core members, Fairy Tail decides to enter the Grand Magic Games, an annual competition to decide Fiore's strongest guild.

The season began airing on October 6, 2012 on TV Tokyo in Japan and concluded its run on March 30, 2013. The first DVD compilation, containing the last two episodes of the fifth season and the first two episodes of the sixth season, was released by Pony Canyon on March 6, 2013. The subsequent episodes of the sixth season were later included in five DVD compilations, each containing four episodes, which were also released by Pony Canyon between April 3, 2013 and August 7, 2013, and the final DVD compilation containing the last three episodes of the season was released on September 4, 2013. It was licensed for a dubbed broadcast in English by Animax Asia, which aired from March 6 to April 9, 2014.

Four pieces of theme music are used during the season. The first opening theme, titled "Break Through" and performed by Going Under Ground, was used for the first sixteen episodes of the season.


Episode list

Notes

References

General

Specific

6
2012 Japanese television seasons
2013 Japanese television seasons